Abigail Pamela Seldin (born January 1988) is an American philanthropist, higher education expert, and edtech entrepreneur. She is the chief executive officer and co-founder of the Seldin/Haring-Smith Foundation, and is known for founding College Abacus, a net price calculator aggregator company, which she sold to Educational Credit Management Corporation (ECMC Group). In 2020, she founded SwiftStudent, a free financial aid tool for students.

Early life and education
Seldin was born in January 1988 to Judith Seldin-Cohen and David Seldin. She attended Phillips Academy, followed by the University of Pennsylvania and graduated in 2009 with a BA and MS degree in anthropology. While in college, Seldin curated a gallery exhibition, Fulfilling a Prophecy: The Past and Present of the Lenape in Pennsylvania, at the Penn Museum. The exhibit highlighted how the cultural heritage of the Lenape people survived their displacement after contact with European settlers in the 17th century.

In 2008, Seldin was awarded a Rhodes Scholarship to attend Oxford University, where she pursued a DPhil in social anthropology. She completed a fellowship in cultural heritage tourism at Hong Kong Tourism Board as a Henry Luce Scholar. In 2015, she was named to the Forbes 30 Under 30 list in the Education category.

Career
In 2012, Seldin and her husband, Whitney Haring-Smith, co-founded College Abacus, a web tool that allows prospective students to compare individualized financial aid packages from American colleges and universities. She served as chief executive officer until it was acquired by ECMC Group, a student loan collection agency, in 2o14. After the acquisition, she served as VP of Innovation at the Washington DC office of ECMC Group. Under Seldin's leadership, debt-repayment and other data from the Obama Administration's College Scorecard initiative were incorporated into College Abacus.
 
In 2019, she co-founded the Seldin/Haring-Smith Foundation, a charitable organization  In a 2021 interview, Seldin described how she and her husband were inspired to found the foundation because of what they saw as an opportunity to fund nonprofit organizations that could help reform both policy and public opinion.

During the COVID-19 pandemic, the Seldin/Haring-Smith Foundation created a no-cost online service called SwiftStudent, to help students submit a financial aid appeal to their institution's aid office. SwiftStudent was named a finalist in Fast Company's World Changing Ideas Awards. As of 2020, the Seldin/Haring-Smith Foundation had partnered with 17 colleges and higher education organizations to test features of SwiftStudent with focus groups of students and financial aid officers. Seldin was a candidate for the role of chief operating officer for the Office of Federal Student Aid during the Biden administration.

In 2021, Seldin published a research report on fraud and links to sex trafficking in certain schools which offer massage therapy certification. The report on sex trafficking and federal financial aid, which studied 18 institutions in five states, was cited as a rationale for an investigation by the United States House Committee on Oversight and Reform in summer 2021.

Seldin currently serves on the board of the Association of American Rhodes Scholars, and previously served on the boards of the Temple University Hope Center, the Montgomery College Foundation. She frequently writes on the topics of educational policy and student financial aid, as seen in a number of publications, including HuffPost, The Hill, Salon.com, The Philadelphia Inquirer, and CNN.

Personal life
Seldin met fellow Rhodes Scholar Whitney Haring-Smith in 2009 and they married in Florida in 2012.

External links 
https://www.abigailseldin.com

References 

American women in business
Phillips Academy alumni
University of Pennsylvania alumni
Alumni of the University of Oxford
American Rhodes Scholars
American technology company founders
American women company founders
American company founders
Living people
1988 births
21st-century American women
American women philanthropists